There are 23 counties and one independent city in the U.S. state of Maryland. Though an independent city rather than a county, the City of Baltimore is considered the equal of a county for most purposes and is a county-equivalent. Many of the counties in Maryland were named for relatives of the Barons Baltimore, who were the proprietors of the Maryland colony from its founding in 1634 through 1771. The Barons Baltimore were Catholic, and George Calvert, 1st Baron Baltimore, originally intended that the colony be a haven for English Catholics, though for most of its history Maryland has had a majority of Protestants.

History
The last new county formation in Maryland occurred when Garrett County was formed in 1872 from portions of Allegany County. However, there have been numerous changes to county borders since that time, most recently when portions of the city of Takoma Park that had previously been part of Prince George's County were absorbed into Montgomery County in 1997.

Outside Baltimore (which is an independent city) the county is the default unit of local government. Under Maryland law, counties exercise powers reserved in most other states at the municipal or state levels, so there is little incentive for a community to incorporate. Many of the state's most populous and economically important communities, such as Bethesda, Silver Spring, Columbia, and Towson are unincorporated and receive their municipal services from the county. In fact, there are no incorporated municipalities at all in Baltimore County or Howard County. The county-equivalent is also the provider of public schools—school districts as a separate level of government do not exist in Maryland.

The City of Baltimore generally possesses the same powers and responsibilities as the counties within the state. It is an entity nearly surrounded by but separate from the County of Baltimore, which has its county seat in Towson.

The Federal Information Processing Standard (FIPS) code, which is used by the United States government to uniquely identify states and counties, is provided with each entry. Maryland's code is 24, which when combined with any county code would be written as 24XXX. The FIPS code for each county links to census data for that county.

List of counties

|}

Defunct counties

See also
 Maryland statistical areas
List of ghost towns in Maryland

References

 
Maryland
Counties